Issa Doumbia (born 10 June 1982) is a French actor and columnist.

Filmography

One-man Show

Television
In 2015, he was columnist in the TV Show Touche pas à mon poste!.

References

External links

1982 births
Living people
21st-century French male actors
French male film actors
French male television actors
Place of birth missing (living people)
People from Versailles